Food Fighters may refer to:

 Food Fighters (action figures), released by Mattel in 1988
 Food Fighters (TV series), an American reality cooking show

See also
 Food Fighter, a 2018 film by Ronni Kahn
 Foo Fighters, an American musical group